James Jackson "Jack" Hough (July 19, 1945 – February 7, 2019) was an American businessman and philanthropist from Gainesville, Georgia.  He founded the company MSE Branded Foods and was its President and CEO for 23 years.  Hough was successful in using the company to establish food courts at airports, colleges, and malls.  Born in Decatur, Alabama, he had served in the U.S. Air Force. He received his bachelor's degree in accounting from University of Alabama.

Hough was shot to death in a pharmacy parking lot on February 7, 2019.

References

1945 births
2019 deaths
American chief executives of food industry companies
People from Decatur, Alabama
Businesspeople from Georgia (U.S. state)
People from Gainesville, Georgia
Military personnel from Alabama
University of Alabama alumni
Deaths by firearm in Alabama
20th-century American businesspeople